The episodes for the sixteenth season of the anime series Naruto: Shippuden are based on Part II for Masashi Kishimoto's manga series. The anime original season follows Kakashi Hatake spending years as a member of the ANBU Black Ops. The episodes are directed by Hayato Date, and produced by Pierrot and TV Tokyo. The season aired from February to May 2014.

The season would make its English television debut on Adult Swim's Toonami programming block and premiere from July 11 to November 7, 2021.

The season contains four musical themes between two openings and endings. The first opening theme,  by Nogizaka46, is used from episode 349 to 356. The second opening theme,  by DOES, is used from episode 357 to 361. The first ending theme,  by Shinkū Hollow, is used from episodes 349 to 356. The second ending theme, "FLAME" by DISH// is used from episode 357 to 361.


Episode list

Home releases

Japanese

English

References
General

Specific

2014 Japanese television seasons
Shippuden Season 16